The Serie B 1964–65 was the thirty-third tournament of this competition played in Italy since its creation.

Teams
Reggiana, Livorno and Trani had been promoted from Serie C, while Modena, SPAL and Bari had been relegated from Serie A.

Final classification

Results

References and sources
Almanacco Illustrato del Calcio - La Storia 1898-2004, Panini Edizioni, Modena, September 2005

Serie B seasons
2
Italy